is a feature-length Doraemon film which premiered on March 10, 1990, in Japan, based on the tenth volume of the same name of the Doraemon Long Stories series. It's the 11th Doraemon film.

Plot
It starts with Nobita seeing a mysterious pink gas at his house. He enters it and arrives at a planet where all animals that can talk. When he wakes up, he tells his dream to his friends. But they do not believe him. When back home, he sees a flower which  he had taken from that planet.
 
The night, Nobita goes to the bathroom and discovers the mysterious pink gas for the second time. When he enters it, Nobita arrives at a forest. Without thinking, Doraemon takes Nobita when that time has a strong wind. He says that his objective is to meet with the animals. They use the bamboo copter to fly. They finally discovered a little dog at the river with a raft that blown by the wind. Nobita helps it to the city that he told. There many of people waiting for that little dog. Finally, the little dog meets with its father while that finally revealed that the name of that dog was Chippo. Nobita invited for a tea party at Chippo's family house. Chippo asked Nobita's house. He told from Tokyo, but Chippo didn't understand. But, Nobita and Doraemon needs to go home. With bamboo copter, they fly back to the pink gas.
 
But, they found something strange. It was a moon that was very big; it was larger than what usually seen from the earth. They finally discovered that this was a different planet. And it only can be accessed from the pink gas. After Doraemon fixes the machine, they go in the pink gas. After that, they realize they are back on earth. In the afternoon, Nobita hears from Gian that he is listening mysterious voices. When he goes back to his home, he founds that the voices are coming from the String less phone.

Nobita tells Doraemon that he can use his gadget, but Doraemon refuses. After Nobita gives him the Star Flower, Nobita, Doraemon, Shizuka and Suneo prepare for going to the Animal Planet. But Suneo wants to go with Gian. Gian comes and says that it became too long to prepare for him. After they go, they found that Chippo was in grave danger. The Nimuges had attacked their planet and captured Chippo's cousin, Romi-Chan. Doraemon gives Nobita a gadget named "Lunar Luck", which works best on unlucky people, which he was incredibly lucky as he is considered to be unlucky.

Nobita Boarded the Star Ship and goes to the Nimuges' planet. Nobita hits a nimuge and puts on his clothes. But the head realizes that some spy was with them and orders them to be lined up to be checked for as spies. Before they could reveal Nobita as the Spy, another Nimuge was revealed to be a spy working for the space police force. Asked to escort him to the cell that Romi was held in, the police turns the tables with the help of Nobita as Romi and Nobita escape just in time. The Nimuge then states their intentions, that they are an offshoot of humans who had squandered their planet's resources and resorted to scavenging to survive. One of the methods used to save what's left of nature was by transferring the animals through the teleportation gas and making them sentient, allowing them to create a new society that would respect nature. The remaining Nimuge however desired to take the planet for themselves and has prepared an invasion fleet to take and colonize the new land.

Nobita and Doraemon prepares a defense against the invaders at the dawn of the next day. Using the air cannons they were able to disable most of the ships and forced them to land as Doraemon improvises when it their guns failed to penetrate the environmental suits. Forced to retreat, the Nimuge commander orders a scorched earth attack on the forest but another fleet of ships approaches from behind. To the relief of the animals and Doraemon they are the Galactic police force who are trying to arrest these Nimuge true identity is a secret organization Team Cockroach who was led by a young man whose family harbored resentment towards the animals for living in paradise through the millennia. The Galactic police force expresses their regret for their actions and their desire to make amends with the animal planet. With the help of the Animal planet, they were able to head home back to Japan.

Cast

Release
 The film was released in Japan on 10 March 1990.
 The Tagalog dubbed of the film was released on GMA television on 1 July 2012.

Guest Characters

Chippo

He is a humanoid dog from the animal planet. He is the Key Character of the Film. He was a good friend of Nobita and Doraemon. They first met when he was caught on a storm and Nobita Saved Him. He likes to do Adventure.

Romi

She is the Cousin of Chippo. When She was captured by the Nimuges, Nobita went to the planet and Saved Her from Them. Through the movie, she was not introduced to anyone except Nobita. She and Nobita are Good Friends.

Chippo's Father

He is the Father of Chippo. He is the Policeman of the Neighborhood.

Nimuges

They were Members of Cockroach Group who wanted to Invade Animal Planet.

External links and Reference 
 Doraemon The Movie 25th page 
 

1990 films
1990 anime films
Nobita and the Animal Planet
Environmental films
Films directed by Tsutomu Shibayama
Films scored by Shunsuke Kikuchi
Films set on fictional planets
Animated films about cats
Animated films about extraterrestrial life
Animated films about robots
Toho animated films